In the election of the Head of State of Costa Rica in 1837, Manuel Aguilar Chacón was elected over Braulio Carrillo Colina using the model of indirect suffrage prescribed by the Fundamental Law of the State of Costa Rica. General election among all citizens authorized to vote was held, using public vote, electing a group of electors proportional to the population of the province they represented who then elected the president directly.

However, Aguilar would not end his term when he resigned for health reasons. Carrillo became a dictator until the invasion of Francisco Morazán and his resignation as part of the agreements of the Jocote Pact.

References

Elections in Costa Rica
1837 elections in Central America
1837 in Costa Rica